Asian Media Information and Communication Centre (AMIC) is a registered charity in Singapore established with seed funding support from Friedrich-Ebert-Stiftung to promote development of media and communication in Asia. It was originally called Asian Mass Communication Research and Information Centre.

In addition to books and reports, it publishes the journals Asian Mass Communication Bulletin and Asian Journal of Communication.

References

External links
 

Charities based in Singapore